The 1951 South Carolina Gamecocks football team was an American football team that represented the University of South Carolina as a member of the Southern Conference (SoCon) during the 1951 college football season. In their 11th season under head coach Rex Enright, the Gamecocks compiled an overall record of 5–4 with a mark of 5–3 in conference play, tying for seventh place in the SoCon.

Schedule

References

South Carolina
South Carolina Gamecocks football seasons
South Carolina Gamecocks football